Larry Dean (born August 7, 1988) is a Canadian football linebacker for the Saskatchewan Roughriders of the Canadian Football League (CFL). He was signed by the Minnesota Vikings as an undrafted free agent in 2011. He played college football at Valdosta State. Dean has also been a member of the Minnesota Vikings, Buffalo Bills, Tampa Bay Buccaneers, Hamilton Tiger-Cats, and Edmonton Eskimos.

College career

In college, Dean helped lead the Blazers to the 2007 NCAA Division II national championship as just a freshman. In his career, Dean never really lived up to earning accolades, including All-America honors. He was projected to be the Gulf South Conference Defensive Player of the Year during his senior year, while also projected to earn the Daktronics National Defensive Player of the Year honors at the Division II level, but he never could due to lack of learning the playbook. He is not the school's all-time leader in tackles, never passing former Blazer and Atlanta Falcon great Jessie Tuggle during his senior season in 2010 as some tried to say he did. He didn't.

Professional career

Minnesota Vikings 
After waiting out an NFL lockout in 2011, Dean graduated from Valdosta State and signed his free agent rookie contract with the Minnesota Vikings on the same day. He was the only undrafted free agent to make the Vikings' roster in 2011. Dean played three seasons in Minnesota, playing in all 48 regular season games and one playoff appearance. In 2012, Dean was one of only 11 special teams players on the NFC’s Pro Bowl ballot. He contributed with 26 tackles, one forced fumble and one fumble recovery.

Buffalo Bills 
Following his departure from the Minnesota Vikings Dean signed with the Buffalo Bills for the 2014 season. Dean played in 13 games for the Bills in 2014, recording seven tackles.

Tampa Bay Buccaneers 
Dean briefly joined the Tampa Bay Buccaneers but did not make an appearance for the team.

Hamilton Tiger-Cats 
After five seasons in the NFL Dean joined the Hamilton Tiger-Cats of the Canadian Football League (CFL). In his first season in the CFL Dean made an immediate impact. He played in all 18 regular season games, amassing 78 defensive tackles, two sacks and a interception. Over the following two seasons Dean was named a CFL East All-Star in each season contributing with 201 tackles, three quarterback sacks and two interceptions.

Edmonton Eskimos
On the first day of free agency Dean signed with the Edmonton Eskimos. In his lone season in Edmonton Dean once again played in all 18 regular season games recording 86 tackles and one sack. He was the unanimous selection for the team's Most Outstanding Defensive Player.

Hamilton Tiger-Cats (II) 
On February 11, 2020, Larry Dean and the Hamilton Tiger-Cats agreed to reunite for another season. However the 2020 season was cancelled and Dean was not re-signed by the Tiger-Cats.

Saskatchewan Roughriders
On February 9, 2021, he was signed by the Saskatchewan Roughriders. On July 8, 2021, Dean tore his Achilles' tendon in a workout ahead of training camp. He was placed on the injured list on July 14. Dean missed the entire 2021 season because of the injury. Dean was re-signed by the Riders on February 3, 2022. Dean had an outstanding season in 2022, eclipsing 100 defensive tackles for the second time in his career.. He also contributed with three sacks, two interceptions and two forced fumbles. On February 8, 2023, Dean and the Riders agreed on another contract extension.

References

External links
Saskatchewan Roughriders profile

1988 births
Living people
People from Tifton, Georgia
Players of American football from Georgia (U.S. state)
American football linebackers
Canadian football linebackers
American players of Canadian football
Valdosta State Blazers football players
Minnesota Vikings players
Buffalo Bills players
Tampa Bay Buccaneers players
Hamilton Tiger-Cats players
Edmonton Elks players
Saskatchewan Roughriders players